Riley Steele is an American pornographic actress and escort .

Early life
Steele grew up in Escondido, California. Before starting her adult film career, she worked at Starbucks and at a golf course snack bar.

Adult film career
In 2005, Steele traveled to Hollywood for the signing of Pirates. There, she met Jesse Jane, who advised her to get into the adult industry.

Steele didn't contact Digital Playground until a couple of years later. Joone, the founder of Digital Playground, signed her to an exclusive contract that same day.

In 2009, Steele starred in an adult film with former UFC fighter War Machine. In January 2011, Steele co-hosted the AVN Awards. On September 20, 2013, Steele signed a two-year contract with director Axel Braun.

Mainstream filmography

Awards

See also
 List of pornographic actors who appeared in mainstream films

References

External links

 
 
 
 

21st-century American actresses
American female adult models
American pornographic film actresses
American film actresses
Living people
People from Escondido, California
Pornographic film actors from California
Year of birth unknown
Year of birth missing (living people)